KGOS (1490 AM) is a radio station broadcasting a country music format. It is licensed to Torrington, Wyoming, United States. The station is currently owned by Kath Broadcasting, and features programming from ABC Radio.

History
The station went on the air as KGOS.

References

External links

GOS
Country radio stations in the United States